Kingston is a historic railroad station located on the Northeast Corridor in the village of West Kingston, in the town of South Kingstown, Rhode Island. It was built at this location in 1875 by the New York, Providence and Boston Railroad, replacing earlier stations dating back to the opening of the line in 1837. Current rail services consist of Northeast Regional trains in each direction, most of which stop at the station. Historically Kingston provided commuter rail service to Providence and Boston via Amtrak's commuter rail services. The MBTA is looking at extending their commuter service with the Providence/Stoughton Line.

History

19th and 20th centuries

The New York, Providence and Boston Railroad opened in November 1837. Since its tracks did not go through the village of Kingston, a new village - West Kingston - sprang up around the railroad station on Waites Corner Road.

The station has remained in continuous use from the day it opened in June 1875. Historically, Kingston Station also served the Narragansett Pier Railroad. Travel time for the  trip between Kingston and Narragansett Pier was approximately 20 minutes before passenger service ended unofficially in June, 1952. (In 2000 the former right-of-way was converted into the William C. O'Neill Bike Path.)

By the 1960s, service to Kingston consisted of regional service from Boston to New York City, plus a single commuter round trip from New London to Boston. When Amtrak took over intercity service from Penn Central in May 1971, Penn Central was not given license to discontinue the commuter trip. When permission was given in 1972, it was replaced with a state-funded Westerly-Providence round trip also stopping at Kingston. This trip lasted until June 1977. From September 1976 to October 1977 and January–April 1978 Amtrak's Clamdigger ran local service from Providence to New Haven with a stop at Kingston. The Beacon Hill replaced the Clamdigger in April 1978, running local from New Haven to Boston. Faced with declining ridership and the loss of state subsidies, the Beacon Hill was discontinued effective October 24, 1981, leaving Kingston with just intercity stopping service.

The station was added to the National Register of Historic Places on April 26, 1975 as Kingston Railroad Station.

An organization called "The Friends of Kingston Station" was instrumental in preserving the station and assuring its restoration after a fire there on December 12, 1988.

Although most Northeast Regional trains stop at Kingston, Acela trains do not. Kingston and Mansfield are the only stations where the Acela will pass through at full speed on tracks adjacent to platforms. Signs and automated announcements warn passengers of the potential danger. Since it is the only station between New London and Providence that can deboard passengers from Acela trains due to its high-level platforms, they occasionally do stop at Kingston in emergencies such as downed wires or problems with the locomotives.

Railroad museum
For a time, half of the station was home to the Rhode Island Railroad Museum. The museum, operated by Friends of The Kingston Railroad Station, was open Sunday afternoons, and included old artifacts from railroads in Rhode Island. Its highlight was an operating model railroad which depicted Kingston in 1948. The museum was closed because the second half of the building is needed due to increasing ridership at the station. The area will be renovated and used as a second waiting room with outlets and extra seating.

Infrastructure expansion

In 2009, RIDOT requested American Recovery and Reinvestment Act of 2009 funds for engineering of a siding and platform that would allow local trains to stop at the station, possibly including future MBTA Commuter Rail trains on an extension of the Providence/Stoughton Line. On June 29, 2015, Amtrak and local officials held a groundbreaking on the expansion of the station. This project will replace the current low-level platforms at the station with new, ADA-accessible high-level platforms and add a -long third track, allowing Acela Express trains to pass through the station while Northeast Regional or possible future commuter rail trains are stopped at the station. Construction work also incorporated installation of drainage, retaining walls and poles to support catenary wires for the new track as well as renovations to the interior of the station. The project was projected to cost $41 million, of which $26.5 million was provided via a High-Speed Intercity Passenger Rail Program (HSIPR) grant from the federal government and RIDOT, with Amtrak providing the remainder of the funding. Amtrak projected a completion of construction by summer 2017. Renovations to Kingston station were officially completed on October 30, 2017

Proposed commuter service
Currently, Kingston is one of only three stations on the Northeast Corridor - along with adjacent stations Westerly and Mystic to the south - that is served exclusively by Amtrak, with no commuter rail service. In 1994, a Rhode Island Department of Transportation (RIDOT) report indicated that the Northeast Corridor was the most viable route for commuter service in Rhode Island. That same year, a Federal Railroad Administration report estimated that Kingston-Providence service would begin in 1999. In 2001, RIDOT released a potential operations plans for South County commuter rail service from Westerly to Providence, with a stop at Kingston plus infill stops at Wickford Junction and T.F. Green Airport. The report considered the service as an extension of Shore Line East, an extension of the MBTA's Providence/Stoughton Line, or a stand-alone service. However, the 2003 Environmental Assessment and a 2009 report studying service to Woonsocket did not discuss extending service further south than Wickford Junction. Service to T.F. Green Airport began in December 2010, and to Wickford Junction in April 2012.

See also
National Register of Historic Places listings in Washington County, Rhode Island

References

Notes

External links

Friends of Kingston Station
Kingston Amtrak Station (USA Rail Guide -- Train Web)

Amtrak stations in Rhode Island
Stations on the Northeast Corridor
Transportation buildings and structures in Washington County, Rhode Island
Buildings and structures in South Kingstown, Rhode Island
Railway stations in the United States opened in 1875
Railway stations on the National Register of Historic Places in Rhode Island
Museums in Washington County, Rhode Island
Historic American Buildings Survey in Rhode Island
National Register of Historic Places in Washington County, Rhode Island
Former New York, New Haven and Hartford Railroad stations
Transportation in Washington County, Rhode Island